Brooklyn Victoria McKnight and Bailey Marné McKnight-Howard (born December 31, 1999) are American YouTubers and social media personalities. They are identical twin sisters. Brooklyn is two minutes older than Bailey.

Career
The twins launched their own YouTube channel, Brooklyn and Bailey, with a focus on teen interests, fashion, beauty, and "all things fun" in 2013.  The twins were listed by Business Insider as one of "13 up-and-coming YouTube stars you should be following" in 2015. Their YouTube channel was nominated for a Streamy Award in the Fashion category.  In November 2015, the sisters launched Squared, a YouTube channel and daily web series described by Variety as being "dedicated to all things twins". Seven sets of twins from North America, the UK, and Australia contribute episodes to the series.  In early 2017, Brooklyn and Bailey announced their entrance into the music industry. The pair partnered with music producer Benny Cassette, and their first track, "Dance Like Me", debuted March 3, 2017. The track charted at #26 for most popular song and #12 for pop US song on iTunes. On April 28, 2017, the twins released their second single, "SiMPLE THiNGS". They released their third song "What We're Made Of" July 13, 2017. Brooklyn and Bailey had previously collaborated with Peter Hollens for a cover of Lennon and Maisy's "A Life That's Good Can Be Bad" in August 2015.  In 2017, the twins also launched their own merchandise line, and they were on Forbes list of Top Influencers – Kids. In 2018, they were finalists in the YouTube Musician category for the 10th annual Shorty Awards. On May 16, 2018, the twins launched their own mascara line called Lash Next Door. The brand quickly added more products that originally focused mostly on hair accessories such as scrunchies and hairclips. The brand later expanded to focus on jewelry, fashion accessories and, following the successful launch of jackets in November 2019, expanded to mainly focus on clothing.

Personal lives 
In April 2018, they both announced that they were going to attend Baylor University in Waco, Texas. They both majored in entrepreneurship.
They graduated a year early in May 2021. In April 2022, Brooklyn graduated as a Master Esthetician from the Skin Science Institute of Laser & Esthetics in Utah.

Their younger sister Kamri Noel McKnight runs a YouTube channel named Kamri Noel with more than 2 million subscribers and their mother Mindy McKnight runs a YouTube channel named Cute Girls Hairstyles with more than 5.6 million subscribers (May 2021).

On October 1, 2021, Bailey married her longtime boyfriend Asa Howard. On September 30, 2022, Brooklyn married boyfriend Dakota Blackburn.

References

External links 
 
Brooklyn and Bailey's official website
 Brooklyn McKnight at IMDb
 Bailey McKnight at IMDb

Living people
1999 births
Identical twin females
Twin musical duos
American YouTubers
American twins
21st-century American singers
Singers from Utah
21st-century American women singers
Female musical duos